Samira Sitail (born 1964, in Bourg-la-Reine) is a Moroccan journalist and important figure in the country's first broadcasting channel 2M TV, where she holds the position of "Director of Information" since May 2001. She entertains close relations with Fouad Ali El Himma, the influential friend and advisor of Mohammed VI.

Born and raised in France, Sitail settled in Morocco in 1987 when she got a job at the national television RTM. She later worked at 2M when it was founded by the Moroccan royal family business ONA Group.

See also 
 Fouad Ali El Himma
 Mounir Majidi

References

External links 
 Interview with Hillary Clinton in 2012

Living people
1964 births
People from Bourg-la-Reine
Moroccan civil servants
People from Casablanca
Moroccan television journalists
Moroccan television presenters
Moroccan women journalists
Moroccan women television journalists
Moroccan women television presenters